Hutsulshchyna (literally, "Hutsul Land") is a national park in Ukraine. It is located in the Western Ukraine's Carpathian Mountains. Hutsulshchyna National Park was created on May 14, 2002, and it covers an area of 32,248 hectares.  Administratively, it is located in Ivano-Frankivsk Oblast.

Topography
The mountain ridges run in parallel lines from northwest to southeast, with relatively flat tops, steep slopes, and wide basins in between. The Cheremosh River runs along the southern border of the park.

See also
National parks of Ukraine
Protected areas of Ukraine

References

External links

National parks of Ukraine